The 1992 Fuji 1000 km was the fifth round of the 1992 All Japan Sports Prototype Car Endurance Championship season. It took place at Fuji Speedway, Japan on October 4, 1992. This race was the last 1000km race at the circuit until the 1999 Le Mans Fuji 1000km.

Race results
Results are as follows:

Statistics
Pole Position – #36 TOM'S 92C-V – 1:14.161
Fastest Lap – #7 TOM'S TS010 – 1:18.487
Winner's Race Time – 5:15:59.024

References

Fuji 1000km
6 Hours of Fuji